Eugene Allen "Gene" Lipscomb (August 9, 1931 – May 10, 1963) was an American football defensive tackle in the National Football League (NFL) for ten seasons and a professional wrestler. He was known by the nickname "Big Daddy".

Early life
Born in Uniontown, Alabama, Lipscomb never knew his father, and moved to Detroit, Michigan, at age three with his mother. When he was eleven, his mother was murdered in the neighborhood where they lived, and he moved in with his maternal grandparents.

Professional career
After graduating from Miller High School, Lipscomb did not attend college and instead served in the United States Marine Corps, where he was stationed at Camp Pendleton and played on the camp's football team.

Signed as an undrafted free agent by the Los Angeles Rams in 1953, Lipscomb played for them through 1955, then was waived in September 1956 and claimed by the Baltimore Colts. In two of his five seasons there, 1958 and 1959, he earned a spot in the Pro Bowl, and was instrumental in the Colts' two consecutive NFL championships in 1958 and 1959, playing alongside hall of famers Gino Marchetti and Art Donovan.

In July 1961, Lipscomb was traded to the Pittsburgh Steelers with center Buzz Nutter for receiver Jimmy Orr, defensive tackle Joe Lewis, and linebacker Dick Campbell. Lipscomb's final NFL game was after the 1962 season at the Pro Bowl in January 1963, in which he was voted lineman of the game. During the 1959–60 and 1960–61 off-seasons, he was a professional wrestler.

The Professional Football Researchers Association named Lipscomb to the PFRA Hall of Very Good Class of 2006.

In 2019, despite currently not being in the Pro Football Hall of Fame, he was chosen as a finalist for the NFL's 100th Anniversary Team

Death
On May 10, 1963, Lipscomb died of an overdose of heroin, on Brice Street in Baltimore, Maryland, at the apartment of Timothy Black. His funeral was in Detroit and he was buried at Lincoln Park Memorial Cemetery.

Further reading
 Davis, Kelcie  "Gene Lipscomb 1931-1963", Blackpast Sports Bio, November 18, 2019

References

External links

Michigan Sports Hall of Fame – Eugene Allen (Gene) Lipscomb
Steeler Nation – Eugene “Big Daddy” Lipscomb

1931 births
1963 deaths
American football defensive ends
American football defensive tackles
Baltimore Colts players
Los Angeles Rams players
Pittsburgh Steelers players
Eastern Conference Pro Bowl players
Western Conference Pro Bowl players
People from Uniontown, Alabama
Players of American football from Detroit
African-American players of American football
Deaths by heroin overdose in the United States
Drug-related deaths in Maryland
United States Marines
20th-century African-American sportspeople